Dohre or Doharey is a surname used in Uttar Pradesh, Madhya Pradesh which belongs to Jatav Chamar caste.

Notable Dohre 
Banwari Lal Dohre - Kannauj Ex Mayor

Ramcharan Dohre - Indian Politician 

Ashok Kumar Doharey - Indian Politician